Fragaria × vescana is a hybrid strawberry cultivar that was created in an effort to combine the best traits of the garden strawberry (Fragaria × ananassa), which has large berries and vigorous plants, with the woodland strawberry (Fragaria vesca), which has an exquisite flavour, but small berries.

This cross cannot take place naturally. Fragaria × ananassa has eight sets of chromosomes whereas Fragaria vesca has only two sets. Repeated attempts to cross these resulted in sterile offspring.

Researchers treated tissue from a Fragaria vesca plant with colchicine to create a mutant plant with four sets of chromosomes. This mutant was then crossed with a Fragaria × ananassa plant, and vigorous fertile offspring were obtained. The offspring were found to be decaploid, (having ten sets of chromosomes).

Fragaria × vescana is not yet commercially important, but remains under development. While the plants are vigorous like their F. × ananassa parents, and the berries have the excellent flavour of the F. vesca parents, the berries are still quite small.

Fragaria × vescana cultivars
The following decaploid strawberries were released by the Swedish breeding program at Balsgård:
  'Annelie'  (1977)
  'Sara'  (1988) — 'Annelie' × [('Sparkle' × F. vesca 4×) open pollinated]
  'Rebecka'  (1998) — ('Fern' × F. vesca 4×) × F. × ananassa F861502

German F. × vescana cultivars:
  'Spadeka'  (1977)
  'Florika'  (1989) — ('Sparkle' × F. vesca 'Semperflorens' 4x) × 'Klettererdbeere Hummi'

References
Bauer, A. 1993. Progress in breeding decaploid Fragaria × vescana. Acta Hort. (ISHS) 348: 60-64

vescana
Berries
Hybrid fruit